is a Japanese football player who play as Midfielder. He currently play for Tochigi City FC.

Club career
Kudo was born in Ichihara on August 28, 1984. He joined J1 League club JEF United Ichihara (later JEF United Chiba) from youth team in 2003. He debuted in first season and played many matches as mainly substitute midfielder from 2004 season. JEF United won the champions in 2005 and 2006 J.League Cup. He became a regular as offensive midfielder in 2007. However the club results were sluggish and was relegated to J2 League end of 2009 season first time in the club history.

In 2011, he moved to J2 club Kyoto Sanga FC. Although he could not play at all in the match for injury until August, he came back in September and won the 2nd place in 2011 Emperor's Cup. He played many matches as regular from 2012.

In 2015, he moved to J1 club Sanfrecce Hiroshima. However he could hardly play in the match.

In June 2015, he moved to newly was promoted to J1 League club, Matsumoto Yamaga FC. Although he played many matches, Yamaga finished at the bottom place in 2015 season and was relegated to J2 in a year.

In July 2018, he re-joined J2 club JEF United Chiba for the first time in 7 years.

On 13 January 2021, Kudo announcement officially transfer to Kanto club, Tochigi City FC for ahead of 2021 season.

National team career
In September 2001, Kudo was selected Japan U-17 national team for 2001 U-17 World Championship. He played all 3 matches.

Career statistics

Club
.

1Includes A3 Champions Cup and Promotion Playoffs to J1.

Honours and Awards

Club 
JEF United Chiba
 J.League Cup Champions : 2005, 2006

 Kyoto Sanga
 Emperor's Cup Runner-up : 2011

 Sanfrecce Hiroshima
 J1 League Champions : 2015

Youth national team 
AFC U-16 Championship : 2000
FIFA U-17 World Cup : 2001
AFC Youth Championship : 2002

References

External links

Profile at Matsumoto Yamaga FC
Profile at Tochigi City FC

1984 births
Living people
People from Ichihara, Chiba
Association football people from Chiba Prefecture
Japanese footballers
Japan youth international footballers
J1 League players
J2 League players
JEF United Chiba players
Kyoto Sanga FC players
Sanfrecce Hiroshima players
Matsumoto Yamaga FC players
Tochigi City FC players
Association football midfielders